Misaki Doi and Kotomi Takahata were the defending champions but both chose not to participate. 
Shuko Aoyama and Rika Fujiwara defeated Aiko Nakamura and Junri Namigata in the final 7–6(3), 6–0.

Seeds

Draw

Draw

References
 Doubles Draw
 Doubles Qualifying

Fukuoka International Women's Cup - Doubles
Fukuoka International Women's Cup